Balshun  is a Syrian village located in Ihsim Nahiyah in Ariha District, Idlib.  According to the Syria Central Bureau of Statistics (CBS), Balshun had a population of 1775 in the 2004 census.

References 

Villages in Idlib Governorate
Populated places in Ariha District